Lugg may refer to:

Geographical names 
 Lugg Island, Antarctica
 Moreton-on-Lugg, village in Herefordshire, England
 River Lugg, Wales and England

People 
 Milton DeLugg (born 1918), American composer and arranger
 Rheanne Lugg (born 1990), Australian rules footballer
 Sheila Tracy (1934–2014), née Lugg, British broadcaster, writer, musician, and singer
 William Lugg (1852–1939), a British actor and singer

Fiction 
 Lugg Brothers, two villains in the fantasy animated series The Pirates of Dark Water
 Magersfontein Lugg, character in the Albert Campion novels by Margery Allingham